Akbaruddin Owaisi (born 14 June 1970) is an Indian politician and leader of All India Majlis-e-Ittehadul Muslimeen (AIMIM) party in Telangana. Since 2014, he has been MLA of the Chandrayangutta constituency in the Telangana Legislative Assembly. Owaisi was appointed as the Chairman of Telangana Public Accounts Committee in 2019.

Owaisi has presided over the Chandrayangutta assembly constituency from 1999, winning for the fifth term in 2018. He assumed the position of floor leader in 2004.

In 2011, while rallying, fifteen armed assailants attacked Owaisi with guns, swords and daggers. His assailants shot him in the abdomen, and he suffers from ongoing medical issues because the bullet is still lodged near his kidney which the doctors warned will affect his legs if removed.

In August 2012, Owaisi claimed while speaking in Karimnagar that there have been "50,000" riots in India over 65 years since the country became independent. He claimed in the speech that a "majority" of those killed in the riots were Muslims.

Owaisi's speeches have drawn comparisons with other populist leaders and his speeches have incited violence on multiple occasions.

Early life and background
Owaisi was born in Hyderabad on 14 June 1970. He was born to a Muslim family to Sultan Salahuddin Owaisi and his wife. Akbaruddin Owaisi and his father reconciled in 1998.

Personal life
Owaisi is married to Sabina Farzana. He has one daughter and one son.

Political career
Owaisi has been elected as the Member of the Legislative Assembly for Chandrayangutta constituency on five consecutive occasions, in 1999, 2004, 2009, 2014 and 2018. He served as a deputy to his elder brother Asaduddin Owaisi, who was leading the AIMIM in the House. In 2004, Akbaruddin became the floor leader of AIMIM in the Assembly upon Asaduddin's election to Lok Sabha from Hyderabad. He was re-elected in 2009 and lead the seven-member AIMIM in the House. Owaisi won his fourth consecutive victory in Assembly polls from Chandrayangutta assembly in 2014. Akbaruddin Owaisi won his Fifth Consecutive victory in Assembly polls from Chandrayangutta Assembly in 2018. In 2019, he was appointed as the Chairman of Telangana Public Accounts Committee.

Other ventures

Established Salar-e-Millat Educational Trust 
Owaisi established Salar-e-Millat Educational Trust which runs a chain of Owaisi School of Excellence in Hyderabad. He provides free education to children in these schools.

Controversies
Academics suggest that Owaisi intentionally uses threatening language, and India's Hindu-led government to position himself and his party as a pan-Indian Islamist movement. Subsequently, political commentators have drawn parallels between Owaisi's political strategy and Italy's nationalist, populist, right-wing Lega Nord party. Some describe Owaisi's brand of hate-speech as Stochastic, meaning the pan-Indian violence resulting from his speeches is sporadic and unpredictable. Thusly, Owaisi's words have a destabilising effect on India's nascent, sometimes fragile democracy.

Threats to kill
In August 2007, along with other elected and serving members of his party, Owaisi made death threats against Taslima Nasrin, pledging that the fatwa against her and Salman Rushdie would be upheld if they visited Hyderabad. Owaisi said, "we in Hyderabad want to behead this woman according to the fatwa."

Racist language
While speaking at a rally in Kurnool in 2011, Owaisi used the derogatory terms Kafirs and Kufrastan to refer to MLAs in Andhra Pradesh Legislative Assembly and the Legislative Assembly. In the same rally he used the Urdu words katil (murderer), darinda (monster), beimaan (dishonest), dhokebaaz (cheat), and chor (thief) for the former Prime Minister of India, P V Narasimha Rao. Owaisi said that if Rao had not died, he (Owaisi) would have killed Rao with his own hands.

Views on Hindu Gods
In April 2012, Owaisi made derogatory and demeaning comments against the Hindu god Rama and his mother Kaushalya. Owaisi asked "Where all did Ram's mother go wandering and where did she give birth to him".

On 12 December 2012, Owaisi made derogatory remarks with hand gestures about a Hindu goddess at a public rally in Nizamabad. He said – "She, who is sitting," and added, "What is this new name Bhagyalakshmi, never heard of her. Shout such slogans such that the Bhagya also shakes and Lakshmi also falls down."

Speech at Adilabad 
On 22 December 2012, Owaisi addressed a rally of twenty to twenty-five thousand people in the Nirmal town of Adilabad district of Andhra Pradesh. In his two-hour-long speech, Owaisi made multiple comments against Hindus, Rashtriya Swayamsevak Sangh, Vishva Hindu Parishad and the Bharatiya Janata Party He said that these people (Hindus) cannot face the Muslims, and whenever the Muslims start dominating the Hindus, the impotent army (police) intervenes. and added that the Muslims could "teach the rest of the world a lesson". Akbaruddin said that 25 crore Muslims would need just 15 minutes without the police to show 100 crore Hindus who is more powerful.

Owaisi referred to Ajmal Amir Kasab, one of the Pakistani terrorists of the 2008 Mumbai attacks, as a "child", and compared him with Narendra Modi. He said that if the Muslims of India united like the Muslims of Andhra Pradesh, Narendra Modi would soon be hanged. Owaisi threatened that if his words were not heard, "O India, destruction and ruin will be your fate". He threatened that India will witness a bloodshed which has not been seen in the last 1000 years. He also dared Narendra Modi to come to Hyderabad, threatening by saying "we will show him then". Owaisi justified the Mumbai bombings of 1993 by saying they were a reaction to the demolition of Babri Masjid and atrocities on Muslims in India.He also questioned the punishment handed out to the accused of the bombings, naming Tiger Memon as one of those punished even though Tiger Memon is still at large.

Owaisi denigrated Hindu gods in his speech. Owaisi mocked Hindu cremation by saying "when you (Hindus) die, you become air after burning and go astray." Owaisi talked in derogatory terms about heritage places of India including Ayodhya, Ajanta Caves and Ellora Caves. He said that if Muslims go away from India, they will take the Taj Mahal, Red Fort and Qutb Minar with them, adding "What will then remain here? Just a razed Ram temple in Ayodhya and naked statues of Ajanta."
 
Owaisi compared the state of Muslims of India to the state of Muslims of the world. Owaisi said that the Rashtriya Swayamsevak Sangh, the Vishva Hindu Parishad, and the Bharatiya Janata Party were poisonous snakes, and to "crush their heads" a stick is enough.

After the speech, Owaisi left for London citing "medical treatment" as the reason. NDTV reported on 3 January that Owaisi was getting treated for intestinal injuries he sustained when he was attacked over a land dispute in 2011. Owaisi returned to Hyderabad on 7 January 2013.

During interrogation a former Islamic State suicide bomber claimed that Owaisi's speeches influenced him. An interrogation report from 2015 revealed that Owaisi's speeches inspired his Jihadi mindset, prompting him to join the terrorist organisation.

Legal proceedings
On 28 December 2012, a petition was filed in a local court in Nampally of Hyderabad against Akbaruddin Owaisi for hurting the sentiments of Hindus, and for making inflammatory, derogatory and offensive remarks. The Andhra Pradesh Human Rights Commission directed the Hyderabad Police Commissioner to submit an inquiry report on the alleged hate speech by 17 January 2013. On 3 January 2013, Abid Rasool Khan, General Secretary of Andhra Pradesh Congress Committee, told the news channel CNN IBN that the state government had "taken cognizance of speech" and they were "collecting evidence to build a strong FIR and a water-tight case where we can book the person causing hatred." On 5 January 2013, a case was filed against Owaisi in Mumbai while a court in Vadodara served a notice on him for his alleged hate speech. In May 2014, Andhra Pradesh government gave nod to prosecute Akbaruddin Owaisi in a 2004 case for an alleged hate speech.

Arrest and bail
Owaisi returned to Hyderabad on 7 January 2013 and was welcomed by his 7 MLA's and MIM leaders at the Hyderabad airport. He later drove to his house in the Banjara Hills area of the city. Owaisi failed to answer a police summons at Nirmal town on 8 January, citing ill-health, and asked for four days' time to appear for investigation. A team of doctors examined Owaisi at his home twice on 7 January. The police declared that he was fit for investigation, even though he complained of bad health. Owaisi also petitioned the High Court of Andhra Pradesh to quash the cases filed against him in lower courts. On 8 January, doctors examined him at the Gandhi Hospital and confirmed that their tests showed no medical grounds to prevent his arrest, following which he was arrested by Hyderabad police. At the Gandhi Hospital, Owaisi alleged that the doctors were trying to murder him by giving lethal injections.
After spending 40 days in prison, Akbaruddin Owaisi was granted bail on 15 February 2013.

Criticism and comments
Owaisi's political opponents refer to him as a "divisive leader".The media frequently criticise him for his anti Hindu, "15 Minutes Speech",   and for making death threats against Salman Rushdie and Taslima Nasrin.

Several notable people and organisations criticised Owaisi for the speeches. The Andhra Pradesh Bharatiya Janata Party president, G. Kishan Reddy called for booking Owaisi, annulment of his assembly membership and de-recognition of All India Majlis-e Ittihad al-Muslimin. Reddy said that "...religious bigotry, unabashed incitement of religious sentiments and contemptuous insinuation against Hindu gods and goddesses formed the crux of the speeches of a person who was sworn in as an MLA". In a statement issued by the Confederation of Voluntary Associations (COVA) on 30 December, several social activists criticised the speech saying that such "obnoxious" speeches will lead to division of society, violation of peace and conflicts. The social activists demanded exemplary action to prevent such "intolerable" acts in future. The signatories to the statement included Asghar Ali Engineer, Swami Agnivesh, Mahesh Bhatt, Hamid Mohammed Khan, Sandeep Pandey and Ram Puniyani. Journalist and BJP leader Balbir Punj said that Owaisi's speech was tantamount to inciting Muslims to revolt against the police and army and start a civil war, and he added that the silence of the media was surprising. Senior Congress Leader and National Spokesperson Raashid Alvi said, "I don't know what Akbar said in his speech and i don't think he said what you just mentioned, but i am sure that Andhra Pradesh Government will do the needful". Asaduddin Owaisi, elder brother of Akbaruddin, refused to comment on the speech saying the matter is sub judice. Congress politician Digvijay Singh said that everybody should think before speaking and demanded action against people making such speeches. TV news channel Times Now reported that the speech was so inflammatory and so provocative that they had decided not to broadcast it. 

Najeeb Jung, vice-Chancellor of the Jamia Millia Islamia university, told CNN-IBN that the police were giving excuses of backroom investigation. However, it only took two-minutes to investigate since the "TV cutout" was available for everybody to see and contents of speech were available on Wikipedia for everybody to read. Jung said that the speech incited incendiary feelings between two communities of an extremely serious nature, and refused to believe Owaisi was ill. BJP spokesperson Mukhtar Abbas Naqvi said referring to Owaisi and his party that the spirit of Osama bin Laden had entered into such people and they were trying to behave like the Taliban.

The speech sparked anger and outrage on Twitter. On 28 December, journalists Karan Thapar and Swapan Dasgupta tweeted "Inflammatory speech by MLA Akbaruddin – Remove police for 15 mins, We will finish off 1 billion Hindus." Writer Taslima Nasrin tweeted that Owaisi is trying to indoctrinate the Muslims of India and such speeches will "produce thousands of Kasabs". Farhan Akhtar tweeted on 2 January 2013: "How can two girls be arrested in less than 24 hours for a harmless FB post, but Owaisi roams free after his blatantly communal rant. He said Owaisi is doing a disservice to the people he pretends to serve and represent. Fact is he represents only himself and serves only himself". 
Meanwhile, Salman Khan's father, Salim Khan, when asked about Owaisi in an interview, stated that Akbaruddin Owaisi is not a Muslim leader. Shazia Ilmi said "Communalists like Owaisi should be arrested and not be glorified! They spew hatred, divide Indians and insult our nation".

References

External links
 

Living people
Indian Muslims
1971 births
Telangana MLAs 2018–2023
Telangana MLAs 2014–2018
Andhra Pradesh MLAs 2004–2009
All India Majlis-e-Ittehadul Muslimeen politicians
Politicians from Hyderabad, India
Andhra Pradesh MLAs 1999–2004